Diary of a Wimpy Kid is a series of family comedy films based on the book series of the same name by Jeff Kinney. The series consists of four theatrical films and two animated films.

Films

Live-action films

Diary of a Wimpy Kid (2010) 

Principal production began on September 21, 2009, and was completed on October 16, 2009. The film was directed by Thor Freudenthal and starred Zachary Gordon as Greg Heffley, Robert Capron as Rowley Jefferson, Rachael Harris as Susan Heffley, Steve Zahn as Frank Heffley, Devon Bostick as Rodrick Heffley, Connor and Owen Fielding as Manny Heffley, Chloë Grace Moretz as Angie Steadman, Grayson Russell as Fregley, Laine MacNeil as Patty Farrell, and Karan Brar as Chirag Gupta. It was the only film in the series to be directed by Freudenthal. The musical score was composed by Theodore Shapiro. The film received mixed reviews from critics. Diary of a Wimpy Kid was released on March 19, 2010, as it moved up from a previously scheduled April 2 release date.

Diary of a Wimpy Kid: Rodrick Rules (2011) 

Based on the second book, Rodrick Rules with elements from The Last Straw. Principal photography began on August 23, 2010, and was completed on October 27, 2010, with filming taking place in Vancouver and New Westminster. Rodrick Rules was directed by David Bowers, with Zachary Gordon reprising his role as Greg Heffley. New main characters include Holly Hills (Peyton List), Grandpa (Terence Kelly), and Bill Walter (Fran Kranz). Edward Shearmur composes the original score for the film. The film also received mixed reviews from critics. Diary of a Wimpy Kid: Rodrick Rules was released on March 25, 2011.

Diary of a Wimpy Kid: Dog Days (2012) 

Based on the third book The Last Straw and the fourth book Dog Days, the film was directed by David Bowers and features the same familiar cast of characters, introducing a few new ones, and also focusing on lesser characters not elaborated on in previous films, including Frank Heffley (Steve Zahn), Mr. Jefferson (Alf Humphreys) and Holly Hills (Peyton List). Dog Days is the last film to feature the original cast, as they had outgrown their roles after filming wrapped. The film also received mixed reviews from critics. Diary of a Wimpy Kid: Dog Days was released on August 3, 2012.

Diary of a Wimpy Kid: The Long Haul (2017) 

Featuring an entirely new cast, the plot follows Greg and his brother Rodrick unwillingly being taken on a family road trip to their great-grandmother's house for her 90th birthday. Greg sees this as an opportunity to meet his internet idol named Mac Digby, and get people to forget about him being dubbed as a meme known as "Diaper Hands". The film was panned by critics and audiences, with most of the criticism aimed at the casting change. Diary of a Wimpy Kid: The Long Haul was released on May 19, 2017.

Animated reboot films

Diary of a Wimpy Kid (2021)

In August 2018, 20th Century Fox CEO Stacey Snider announced that a fully animated television series based on Diary of a Wimpy Kid was in development. On August 6, 2019, after the acquisition of 21st Century Fox by Disney, the project was confirmed to be still in development for their streaming service, Disney+.

In December 2020, the project was confirmed to have been redeveloped as an animated film. On September 2, 2021, Disney officially confirmed that the new movie would be simply titled Diary of a Wimpy Kid, and would be released on December 3, 2021. The movie is a re-adaptation of the first book and the characters appear similar in design to their appearances in the book series. The first trailer was officially released in October 2021. Unlike the previous films, which were produced by 20th Century Fox, this film was produced by Walt Disney Pictures, although it was originally in production at 20th Century Animation.

Diary of a Wimpy Kid: Rodrick Rules (2022) 

On October 23, 2021, ahead of the first film's release, Jeff Kinney revealed that sequels are already in development. For Disney+ Day, Kinney revealed that the sequel, based on Rodrick Rules, was released on December 2nd, 2022. Unlike the first animated film, a copyright notice at the end of the trailer indicates that 20th Century Studios has involvement in the film.

Future 
Kinney stated that he intends to adapt all his books into animated features for Disney+.

Short film 
An animated short film set after the events of the third film, titled Diary of a Wimpy Kid: Class Clown, was released on the home media release of Dog Days in 2012. The short is told through Greg's point-of-view as he explains his humorous experience. Zachary Gordon reprises his role as Greg Heffley along with other cast members voicing their characters from the films in minor roles.

Canceled TV special 
In 2012, Jeff Kinney, the author of the Diary of a Wimpy Kid books, announced the possibility for an animated film to be based on Diary of a Wimpy Kid: Cabin Fever as the next installment. In an interview for Diary of a Wimpy Kid: Hard Luck, Kinney stated he was working with FOX on a half-hour special based on Cabin Fever, which was scheduled to air in late-2014. The special was meant to be an animated production developed at 20th Century Fox Animation, and had begun development while Kinney worked on the live-action films. Nothing regarding the special ever materialized.

Principal cast and characters

Crew

Reception

Box office performance

Critical and public response

Notes

References 

 
Film series introduced in 2010
20th Century Studios franchises
Children's film series
Films scored by Theodore Shapiro
Films scored by Edward Shearmur
Walt Disney Studios (division) franchises